Alberto de Angelis (born 1885) was an Italian writer mostly remembered for writing a biography of Domenico Mustafà, entitled Domenico Mustafa – La Cappella Sistina e la Società Musicale Romana.

The book was published in 1926, and is considered of significant importance for its valuable account of Mustafa's life, the musical society in Rome, and the other castrati singers at the Capella Sistina.

De Angelis, Alberto
De Angelis, Alberto
1885 births
Year of death missing